Nature Planned It is a studio album by American vocal group the Four Tops, released on April 17, 1972. It was released under the Motown record label and was produced by Frank Wilson.

Track listing

Side one 

 I Am Your Man — 4:30
 (It's the Way) Nature Planned it — 3:50
 I'll Never Change — 2:43
 She's an Understanding Woman — 2:54
 I Can't Quit Your Love — 3:35
 Walk with Me Talk with Me, Darling —  2:35

Side two 

 Medley (Hey Man/We Got to Get You a Woman) — 7:14
 You Got to Forget Him Darling — 2:38
 If You Let Me — 2:50
 Happy (Is a Bumpy Road) — 2:56
 How Will I Forget You — 2:47

Personnel 

 Leonard Caston — keyboard
 Richard "Pistol" Allen, Andrew Smith — drums
 Jack Ashford — percussion
 Eddie "Bongo" Brown — conga, bongos
 Dennis Coffey, Eddie Willis, Mel Ragen — guitar
 James Jamerson — bass

Production 

 Frank Wilson — producer
 Cal Harris — recording engineer
 John Lewis — mastering engineer
 Jerry Long, David Van De Pitte — arrangements

References 

1972 albums
Four Tops albums
Motown albums